The 2014 Tallahassee mayoral election took place on August 26, 2014 in the city of Tallahassee, Florida. 

Incumbent Mayor John Marks refused to run a third term which resulted in a new seat being open for the candidates. A nonpartisan primary was held between three candidates with Andrew Gillum winning the race by 76 percent. 

A run-off election was supposed to be held on November 4 between Gillum and the write-in candidate Evin Matthews. However, Mathews withdrew from the race on August 27, 2014, resulting in Gillum becoming the mayor-elect.

Election results

First round

References

2014
2014 Florida elections
2014 United States mayoral elections